Stadio Mariotti is an arena in Alghero, Sardinia (Italy).  It is primarily used for football, and is the home to the Polisportiva Alghero of the Eccellenza Sardinia. The stadium has a capacity of 2,815 spectators.

References

Football venues in Italy
Sports venues in Sardinia